Shouting Fire: Stories from the Edge of Free Speech is a 2009 documentary film about freedom of speech and the First Amendment in the United States, directed by Liz Garbus. The documentary prominently features First Amendment attorney, Martin Garbus, who talks about the past and present state of free speech in the United States, and the case of Ward Churchill.  A tenured professor of Ethnic Studies at the University of Colorado, Churchill was fired after publishing a controversial article about the 9/11 attacks and being investigated for academic misconduct related to other issues.  The film also explores the cases of Debbie Almontaser, Chase Harper, and protesters at the 2004 Republican National Convention in New York City. Those interviewed include historians, legal scholars and attorneys, such as Floyd Abrams, David Horowitz, Eric Foner, Donna Lieberman, Daniel Pipes, Richard Posner, Kenneth Starr and Josh Wolf.

References

External links 
 
 
 HBO Films' Shouting Fire: Stories from the Edge of Free Speech

2009 films
2009 documentary films
American documentary films
American independent films
Documentary films about American politics
Films about freedom of expression
Films directed by Liz Garbus
2000s English-language films
2000s American films